Southern Railway Depot in Piedmont, Alabama, is a station that served the Southern Railway from 1868.  It was added to the Alabama Register of Landmarks and Heritage on May 27, 1983, and was listed on the National Register of Historic Places on January 5, 1984.

References

National Register of Historic Places in Calhoun County, Alabama
Properties on the Alabama Register of Landmarks and Heritage
Railway stations in the United States opened in 1868
Railway stations on the National Register of Historic Places in Alabama
Piedmont
Transportation buildings and structures in Calhoun County, Alabama
1868 establishments in Alabama
Former railway stations in Alabama